Hybolasius lanipes is a species of beetle in the family Cerambycidae. It was described by Sharp in 1877. It is known from New Zealand.

References

Hybolasius
Beetles described in 1877